Whipple may refer to:

People
Whipple (surname) (including a list of people with the surname)
Whip Jones (1909–2001), American ski industry pioneer, founder, developer and original operator of the Aspen Highlands ski area in Aspen, Colorado
Whipple Van Buren Phillips (1833–1904),  American businessman, grandfather of H. P. Lovecraft, whom he raised

Fictional characters
Mr. Whipple, in American television ads for Charmin toilet paper
Whipple Jones (The Bold and the Beautiful), in the American soap opera The Bold and the Beautiful

Places in the United States
Whipple, Ohio, an unincorporated community
Whipple, West Virginia, an unincorporated community
Whipple Lakes, Crow Wing County, Minnesota
Whipple Lake, Clearwater County, Minnesota
Whipple Mountains, a mountain range in southeastern California
Whipple Run, a stream in Ohio

In the military
, three U.S. Navy ships named after Abraham Whipple
Fort Whipple, Arizona, a fort established in 1863 in Arizona Territory near Prescott
Fort Whipple, historical name for the United States Army's Fort Myer

Science 
 Whipple (crater), a crater on the Moon
 36P/Whipple, periodic comet discovered by Fred Whipple
 Whipple (spacecraft), proposed space telescope in the 2010s
 Fred Lawrence Whipple Observatory, an astronomical observatory in Arizona, United States
 Whipple Museum of the History of Science, a science museum of the University of Cambridge
Whipple shield, a type of hypervelocity impact shield
Whipple procedure, a surgery to remove the head of the pancreas, due to pancreatic cancer

See also
Whipple's disease, a rare bacterial disease (first described by George Whipple)
Whipple procedure, surgical removal of pancreatic cancer (devised by Allen Whipple)
Whipple's triad, conditions necessary for proving a diagnosis of hypoglycemia (by Allen Whipple)